Spion Kop Quarry is a  nature reserve in Gloucestershire in the Forest of Dean.

The site is managed by the Gloucestershire Wildlife Trust and held under agreement with the Forestry Commission. The site is listed in the 'Forest of Dean Local Plan Review' as a Key Wildlife Site (KWS).

Location and use
The site is on Purples Hill and about one and a half miles to the east of Coleford. It lies in the middle of the Nagshead and Barnhill Plantations.  It is a large, deep quarry and is considered to be the best example of a quarry in the Dean Coal Measures. The quarry's stone blocks would have been durable and much prized for buildings. The quarry is one of many in the Bixslade area which are on Pennant Sandstone.

The quarry became disused in the early 20th century. Shropshire Archives (sic) have photographs of it in operation. It is remote and has developed an interesting flora and fauna. As a consequence there are restrictions on the use of the rock faces for mountaineering purposes.  In particular, no climbing is allowed in the nesting season, and the faces which have the best plant growth are not permitted in the climbing routes.

The site
The main rock face is some 100 feet high.  There are three parts to it being a south bay, a north bay and a central tower. Opposite the south bay is a small wall which is west facing. There are vistas across the Cannop valley from the spoil tips to the east of the reserve. The boundaries of the reserve have safety fencing.

Flora
This is an area for ferns and many grow in the rock crevices.  They include maidenhair spleenwort, lady-fern, scaly male-fern, western polypody and hard fern.  Other species recorded are tutsan, bilberry, wood sage and foxglove. Mosses thrive on the boulders.

There is a plantation of Douglas fir and beech to the west of the reserve. Scrub includes holly, gorse bushes, rowan, birch, goat willow, hawthorn and elder.

Birds
Nesting birds include common redstart, great tit and blue tit. The wood warbler and turtle dove are recorded visitors.

Conservation
Vistas are maintained to allow the rock face to be seen from beyond the boundary fence. Monitoring is done of the effect  on the flora of the climbing activity.

Walks
There is a publication which details places to visit for recreation, and for observing particular wildlife in this part of the Forest of Dean.

Publications

 Kelham, A, Sanderson, J, Doe, J, Edgeley-Smith, M, et al., 1979, 1990, 2002 editions, 'Nature Reserves of the Gloucestershire Trust for Nature Conservation/Gloucestershire Wildlife Trust'
 ‘Nature Reserve Guide – discover the wild Gloucestershire on your doorstep’ - 50th Anniversary, January 2011, Gloucestershire Wildlife Trust
 'Where to see Wildlife in the Forest of Dean', January 2012, Gloucestershire Wildlife Trust

References

External links
 Gloucestershire Wildlife Trust
 Forestry Commission

Nature reserves in Gloucestershire
Forest of Dean
Quarries in Gloucestershire